Trollius is a genus of about 30 species of flowering plants closely related to Ranunculus, in the family Ranunculaceae. The common name of some species is globeflower or globe flower. The generic name is derived from the Swiss-German word "Trollblume", meaning a rounded flower. Native to the cool temperate regions of the Northern Hemisphere, with the greatest diversity of species in Asia, Trollius usually grow in heavy, wet clay soils.

Description
They are mostly herbaceous, fibrous rooted  perennials  with bright yellow, orange or lilac coloured flowers. The name "globe flower" refers to the petals of T. europaeus and T. × cultorum which are curved over the top of the flower, forming a globe. But T. pumilus has flatter flowers, and T. chinensis has open flowers with prominent stamens.

Ecology
All species of Trollius are poisonous to cattle and other livestock when fresh, but their acrid taste means they are usually left uneaten. They are, however, used as food plants by the larvae of some Lepidoptera species including silver-ground carpet.

Cultivation
Some species are popular ornamental flowers in horticulture, with several cultivars selected for large and brightly coloured flowers. The hybrid T. × cultorum in particular is a source of several garden cultivars, including 'Superbus', which has gained the Royal Horticultural Society's Award of Garden Merit.

Image gallery

References

 
Ranunculaceae genera